The Velvet Touch is a 1948 American film noir drama directed by Jack Gage and starring Rosalind Russell, Leon Ames, Leo Genn and Claire Trevor.

Plot
Broadway leading lady Valerie Stanton (Russell) accidentally kills her producer and former lover, Gordon Dunning (Ames), during an argument about the direction her career should take. He expects her to sign for his next production, a typical frothy comedy for which he is known, whereas she wants to star in a revival of Hedda Gabler to prove her versatility as an actress.

Other characters involved in the plot are Michael Morrell (Genn), Valerie's new beau; supporting actress Marian Webster (Trevor), who is wrongly accused of committing Valerie's crime; and police Capt. Danbury (Greenstreet), who may know more than he is willing to disclose.

Cast
 Rosalind Russell as Valerie Stanton
 Leo Genn as Michael Morrell
 Claire Trevor as Marian Webster
 Sydney Greenstreet as Capt. Danbury
 Leon Ames as Gordon Dunning
 Frank McHugh as Ernie Boyle
 Walter Kingsford as Peter Gunther
 Dan Tobin as Jeff Trent
 Lex Barker as Paul Banton
 Nydia Westman as Susan Crane
 Theresa Harris as Nancy
 Russell Hicks as Actor "Judge Brack"
 Irving Bacon as Herbie
 Esther Howard as Pansy Dupont
 Harry Hayden as Mr. Couch
 Martha Hyer as Helen Adams

Reception
New York Times film critic Bosley Crowther thought the plot and its conclusion was too obvious. He wrote: "Since the murder is prefatory business in this new film which came to the Rivoli yesterday, we are telling no more than you'll witness two minutes after the picture begins. The rest is a long and tortuous survey of Miss Russell's efforts to elude discovery as the rather obvious murderess and get on with her promising career . . . This foregone conclusion of the story is only one of the film's weaknesses. The muddiness of the character played by Miss Russell is another one. The role was so randomly written by Leo Rosten that one finds it hard to see any solid personality or consistency in the dame."

Film critic Dennis Schwartz praised the production and called the film: "A sparkling crime melodrama richly steeped in theatrical atmosphere." In addition he wrote: "In this solid production, the tension is kept up until the final curtain call as to whether Russell will confess, get caught, or get away with the crime of passion."

References

External links
 
 
 
 

1948 films
1948 drama films
1940s psychological thriller films
American black-and-white films
American thriller drama films
American psychological thriller films
1940s English-language films
Film noir
Films scored by Leigh Harline
Films about actors
Films set in New York City
RKO Pictures films
1948 directorial debut films
1940s American films